Persatuan Sepakbola Demak (simply known as PSD Demak) is an Indonesian football club based in Demak Regency, Central Java. They currently compete in the Liga 3.

Rivalries
PSD Demak have a very tough competitor in the League of Persipa Pati. This game is also often called the Muria Derby.

Notable Player
  Kartono

Supporter 
Bode (fullname Bocah Demak) is supporter of PSD Demak.

Kit Suppliers
 Vilour (2009–2010)
 Nike (Piala Indonesia 2018/19) 
 MJS Apparel (2020)
 Expert Sportswear (2021-Present))

References

External links
 LigaIndonesia.co.id
 

Demak Regency
Football clubs in Central Java
Football clubs in Indonesia
Association football clubs established in 1963
1963 establishments in Indonesia